Myrica quercifolia is a species of shrub in the genus Myrica. It is endemic to the Cape Provinces and the North West of South Africa.  It is also known by the names oak waxberry and maagpynbossie (Afrikaans for stomach pain bush).

Conservation status 
Myrica quercifolia is classified as Least Concern.

References

External links 
 
 

Endemic flora of South Africa
Flora of South Africa
Flora of the Cape Provinces
quercifolia